The Dubai Financial Services Authority (DFSA) is the financial regulatory agency of the special economic zone, the Dubai International Financial Centre (DIFC), In Dubai, United Arab Emirates. It is distinct from the UAE's federal Securities and Commodities Authority, whose jurisdiction covers the wider UAE outside the boundaries of the DIFC. It operates only within the special economic zone and is tasked with providing a regulatory environment of international standards.

The DFSA's regulatory mandate includes asset management, banking and credit services, securities, collective investment funds, custody and trust services, commodities futures trading, Islamic finance, insurance, an international equities exchange, and an international commodities derivatives exchange. In addition to regulating financial and ancillary services, the DFSA is responsible for supervising and enforcing anti-money laundering (AML) and counter-terrorist financing (CTF) requirements applicable in the DIFC. The DFSA has also accepted a delegation of powers from the DIFC Registrar of Companies (RoC) to investigate the affairs of DIFC companies and partnerships where a material breach of DIFC Companies Law is suspected and to pursue enforcement remedies available to the Registrar.

Legal framework 
Article 121 of the UAE Constitution enabled the Federation to create Financial Free Zones in the Emirates and, most importantly, to exclude the application of certain Federal laws in these Financial Free Zones. A number of laws created the DIFC and the necessary centre bodies, which include the DFSA. The laws set out the objectives, powers and functions of the central bodies. They also contain important exemptions and prohibitions in the DIFC.

History
The agency was established in 2004 as part of the establishment of the Dubai International Financial Centre.

Mismarking
In 2016, a trader at a company authorized by the Dubai Financial Services Authority was banned for six years from performing any functions in connection with the provision of financial services in the Dubai International Financial Centre after he mismarked his trading book.

Treatment of whistleblowers 
In 2019, it was reported that the DFSA was accused of retaliating against a whistleblower in a drug money laundering case.

See also
Securities Commission
Economy of Dubai
List of financial regulatory authorities by country

References

Economy of Dubai
Government agencies of Dubai
Financial regulatory authorities of the United Arab Emirates